The 17th New Zealand Parliament was a term of the New Zealand Parliament. It was elected at the 1908 general election in November and December of that year.

1908 general election

The Second Ballot Act 1908 was used for the 1908 general election. The first ballot was held on Tuesday, 17 November in the general electorates.  22 second ballots were held one week later on 24 November, and in one large rural electorate (Bay of Plenty), two weeks were allowed before the second ballot was held on 1 December. The Second Ballot Act did not apply to the four Māori electorates and the election was held on Wednesday, 2 December.  A total of 80 MPs were elected; 41 represented North Island electorates, 35 represented South Island electorates, and the remaining four represented Māori electorates.  537,003 voters were enrolled and the official turnout at the election was 79.8%.

Sessions
The 17th Parliament sat for four sessions (there were two sessions in 1909), and was prorogued on 20 November 1911.

Ministries
The Liberal Government of New Zealand had taken office on 24 January 1891.  Joseph Ward formed the Ward Ministry on 6 August 1906. The Ward Ministry remained in power until Ward's resignation as Prime Minister in 1912.

Party composition

Start of term

Initial composition of the 17th Parliament

By-elections during 17th Parliament
There were a number of changes during the term of the 17th Parliament.

Notes

References

17
1908 in New Zealand
1908 in law